Ray Jardine (born in 1944) is an American rock climber who, along with Bill Price, in May 1979, was the first to free climb the West Face of El Capitan in Yosemite Valley. Jardine is also a mountaineer, sea kayaker, sailor, hang glider pilot, sailplane pilot, small aircraft pilot, skydiver, long-distance hiker, bicyclist, motorcyclist, and gear designer.

Jardine is noted for inventing and developing the spring-loaded camming devices called Friends with the late Mark Vallance, 
 which revolutionized rock climbing in the late 1970s. He is also noted for his major contributions to the ultralight backpacking community through his books and his "make-it-yourself" gear company, Ray-Way Products.

Early life
Born in Colorado Springs, Colorado, as a youth, Jardine climbed Colorado's Pikes Peak dozens of times, mostly solo, and with the Boy Scouts of America. In 1959, Jardine achieved Eagle Scout (Boy Scouts of America). During his Junior and Senior years (1959-1961) at General William J. Palmer High School in Colorado Springs, Jardine competed in Gymnastics on the Trampoline. He worked part-time after school at his family's plumbing business.

In 1963, at the age of 19, Jardine took a summer job in Yellowstone National Park, and enrolled in his first rock climbing class with instructor Barry Corbet (member of the 1963 Mount Everest expedition), in Grand Teton National Park. In the fall of that year, Jardine enrolled at Northrop University in Los Angeles, California.

During the three years of his formal education at Northrop, Jardine worked evenings as a draftsman at North American Aviation in Los Angeles, California. In the spring of 1967 Jardine graduated from Northrop University with a degree in Aerospace Engineering.

Professional life
Immediately following his graduation from Northrop University in 1967, Jardine was hired by Martin Marietta as a specialist in computer-simulated space-flight mechanics, shaping trajectories for earth satellite and interplanetary missions.

Colorado rock climbing
He began his climbing career in 1963 in the Tetons and climbed in Eldorado Canyon State Park near Boulder, Colorado during the 1960s.

Yosemite rock climbing
Jardine became active in Yosemite around 1970. During the 1970s he pioneered a number of Yosemite routes harder than had been done before, up to the grade of 5.13, including the first ascent of The Phoenix (5.13a) in 1977. After chipping holds while attempting to free "The Nose" (now referred to as Jardine Traverse), Jardine was ostracized from the climbing community and is likely the most vilified climber in Yosemite climbing history.

Sailing and SCUBA
In 1982, Ray and his wife Jenny sailed around the world in three years aboard their 41-foot ketch Suka (an acronym for "Seeking UnKnown Adventures").

During the voyage, they spent six months scuba diving and snorkeling in the Caribbean. Ray is a Professional Association of Diving Instructors (PADI) certified diver.

Light-weight hiking enthusiast
In 1991 he discussed ideas related to backpacking with the publication of his PCT Hikers Handbook, which described hiking the entire Pacific Crest Trail in a much shorter time, using homemade lightweight gear and techniques including early start times with longer days and more mileage at a slower pace. The book was revised and retitled in 1999 as Beyond Backpacking, and revised and retitled again in 2009 as Trail Life.

In 1998, according to former GoLite owner Kim Coupounas, it was Ray Jardine designed the original 12 lightweight backpacking products offered by the startup company, who had a royalty arrangement with Jardine in its early years.

Antarctica: Skiing to the South Pole
Starting on November 11, 2006 at the Patriot Hills Base Camp on Antarctica, Ray and his wife Jenny skied to the South Pole. They pulled sleds containing their gear and supplies. They traveled for 57 days and covered 750 miles and reached the South Pole on January 8, 2007.

See also 
History of rock climbing
List of first ascents (sport climbing)

References

External links
 Ray Jardine homepage
 Friends History

American rock climbers
1944 births
Living people
Hikers
Northrop University alumni
Martin Marietta people